Alien Brain may refer to:

 Teenage Zombies: Invasion of the Alien Brain Thingys!, a video game
 Alien Brain from Outer Space, episode 4 of Frankenstein Jr. and The Impossibles
 "Mr. Alien Brain Vs. The Skinwalkers", an album by Psychic TV
 The antagonist in X-COM: UFO Defense